Kapweiler is a small village in the commune of Saeul, in western Luxembourg.  , the town has a population of 30.

References 

Towns in Luxembourg
Redange (canton)